Mount Carpe could mean:

 Mount Carpe (Alaska), a peak of the Alaska Range northeast of Mount McKinley (Denali)
 Mount Carpe (British Columbia), a peak in the Cariboo Mountains